Evgeniya Grigorivna Doluhanova (born 10 June 1984) is a Ukrainian chess player who holds the FIDE title of Woman Grandmaster (WGM, 2006). From 2011 to 2013 represented Armenia.

Chess career
In 2004 in Alushta won bronze medal in Ukrainian women's chess championship. In 2009 in Yevpatoria she won Ukrainian women's chess championship.

In 2005 in Kharkiv she taken 2nd place in international women's chess tournament Femida 2005 (tournament won Oksana Vozovic). In 2007 she taken 2nd place in Kharkiv Rector cup. In 2009 in Suzdal she won Elisaveta Bykova memorial and in Kharkiv won international women's chess tournament Kaissa 2009. In 2011 in Saint Petersburg she taken 2nd place in Lyudmila Rudenko memorial (tournament won  Aleksandra Goryachkina). In 2012 in Jakarta she taken 3rd place in international women's chess tournament Japfa Chess Festival. In 2014 she won international women's chess tournament in Sautron. In 2017, she took second place in the Maria Albulet Memorial in Braila.

In 2003, she was awarded the FIDE Woman International Master (WIM) title and received the FIDE Woman Grandmaster (WGM) title three year later.

References

External links
 
 
 

1984 births
Living people
Ukrainian female chess players
Armenian female chess players
Chess woman grandmasters
Sportspeople from Baku